Howard Williams Johnson (born November 28, 1956, in Miami, Florida) is a former American soul/disco singer, and founder of the group Niteflyte. He charted two songs on the Hot Dance Music/Club Play chart during the 1980s – "So Fine", which spent one week at No. 1 in 1982, and "Let This Dream Be Real," which reached No. 19 in 1983.

Career
R&B vocalist Howard Johnson started out in Miami, performing in local bars and clubs until the appearance of a life-changing business contact. That was Sandy Torano, a guitarist and producer associated with performers such as the Commodores and Phyllis Hyman. Johnson was his choice for a new vocalist and thus began the singer's recording career in 1977, as the group Niteflyte under Ariola records. The project lasted for only two albums but A&M later signed Johnson to a solo contract.

A trio of close associates; Kashif, Paul Laurence Jones, and Morris Brown produced Keepin' Love New (1982), Johnson's first album. Both "So Fine" and the title track did very well in the UK Singles Chart. The singer recorded two more albums for the label: Doin' It My Way (1983), produced by the System, and The Vision (1985), some of which was handled by Jimmy Jam and Terry Lewis. In 1986 Johnson recorded the ballad "Perfect Timing" with singer Donna Allen which appeared on her debut album of the same name. In 1989, the singer returned to A&M as part of the duo Johnson & Branson with Regis Branson.

Throughout the 1990s, Johnson did not record any new albums. He returned in the new millennium collaborating again with Regis Branson. He released Packed and Waitin''' on Soul Japan Records in 2002. Roughly a decade later, Johnson's A&M albums were reissued by the Netherlands' PTG label.

Discography
Studio albums
{| class="wikitable"
|-
! scope="col" rowspan="2"| Year
! scope="col" rowspan="2"| Album
! scope="col" colspan="2"| Peak chart positions
|-
! style="width:45px;"|US
! style="width:45px;"|US R&B
|-
| 1982
| Keepin' Love New 
| align=center | 122
| align=center | —
|-
| 1983
| Doin' It My Way| align=center | —
| align=center | 61

|-
| 1985
| The Vision| align=center | —
| align=center | 46
|-
| 1989
| Johnson and Branson (with Regis Branson)
| align=center | —
| align=center | —
|-
| 2002
| Packed and Waitin' (Japan only, with Regis Branson)
| align=center | —
| align=center | —
|-
| 2010
| Howard Johnson| align=center | —
| align=center | —
|-
| colspan="5" style="text-align:center; font-size:9pt;"| "—" denotes releases that did not chart.
|}

CompilationsHoward Johnson – Doin' It My Way / The Vision'' (2007)

Singles

References

External links
Howard Johnson Discography at Discogs.
Official Website

Living people
Musicians from Miami
American soul singers
American boogie musicians
American dance musicians
1956 births
20th-century African-American male singers